Benny Hill's Madcap Chase is a ZX Spectrum videogame featuring Benny Hill and loosely based on his Thames TV show. It was programmed by Don Priestley and published by DK'Tronics in 1985. The plot involves Benny deciding to help his neighbours by completing a number of tasks for them.

Reception

Crash, a ZX Spectrum gaming magazine, gave Benny Hill's Madcap Chase a positive review and awarded it 78%. Amongst the features the reviewers liked were the large graphics which avoided attribute clash, and the sense of humour with one reviewer stating that they "[loved] it when Benny hit something or the lady chasing him had a fit". The game was described as "playable" and "addictive" although there were concerns about its long-term appeal.

Rick Robson, writing in Your Sinclair magazine was less positive, awarding it a score of 6/10, stating that "True Hill fans will lament the absence of Hills Angels and the risky jokes but if you prefer being chased to chaste, this is the one for you, poor soul".

References

External links 
 Benny Hill's Madcap Chase on ysrnry.co.uk
 Screenshots and comments at gamingafter40

1985 video games
Europe-exclusive video games
Video games developed in the United Kingdom
ZX Spectrum games
ZX Spectrum-only games
Single-player video games